The World Ski Orienteering Championships (Ski-WOC) is the official event to award the titles of World Champions in ski orienteering. The World Championships is organized every odd year. The programme includes Sprint, Middle and Long Distance competitions, and a Relay for both men and women. The first Ski-WOC was held in 1975.

Host towns/cities

Classic/Long
This event was called "Classic distance" from 1975 to 1986. Since 1988 it is called "Long distance".

Men's classic/long distance

Women's classic/long distance

Short/Middle
This event was called "Short distance" from 1988 to 2000. Since 2002 it is called "Middle distance".

Men's short/middle distance

Women's short/middle distance

Sprint
This event was first held in 2002.

Men's sprint

Women's sprint

Relay

Men's relay

Women's relay

Mixed Sprint Relay
This event was first held in 2011.

2017 redistribution of medals
In July 2017 it was announced that the IOF Council had decided to redistribute the medals for 2017, following the disqualification of Polina Frolova's results from the World Ski Orienteering Championships 2017 due to violation of anti-doping rules.

All-time medal table

(Updated after 2019 competition)

See also
 Ski Orienteering
 World Cup in Ski Orienteering
 Junior World Ski Orienteering Championships

References

External links and references
 World Ski Orienteering History
 IOF International Orienteering Federation
 World Ski Orienteering Championships 2009

 
Ski-orienteering competitions
Orienteering
Ski